The Broadfield Stadium is a multi-purpose stadium in Crawley, England. It is currently used mostly for football matches and is the home ground of Crawley Town F.C. The stadium has a capacity of 6,134 people, and is owned by Crawley Borough Council.

Between 2013 and 2018, the stadium was named the Checkatrade.com Stadium as part of a sponsorship deal. In late 2018, the stadium was renamed "The Peoples Pension Stadium" as part of a new sponsorship deal. For the 2022/23 Season, the stadium has reverted back to being named the "Broadfield Stadium".

History 
Crawley Town FC spent 48 years at their Town Mead home until the land was sold to developers in 1997. The club then moved to the Broadfield Stadium, about two miles across town.

In January 2012 the application for the new 2,000-seater East Stand (and facilities including new turnstiles and Premier League standard flood lights) was accepted by Crawley Borough Council. The upgrade is required to meet the league rules which require a minimum 5,000 capacity stadium. After just one week of construction, the new East Stand was completed on 2 April 2012, bringing the total capacity of the Broadfield Stadium to 5,500. Upon completion, Crawley's first game with the new stand was against League Two side Crewe Alexandra on 6 April. The match ended in a 1–1 draw, with a new record crowd of 4,723, the previous best being 4,522.

The record attendance reached 5,880 on Saturday 5 January 2013 when Crawley Town hosted Reading in the FA Cup.

Between 2013 and 2018, the stadium was called The Checkatrade.com Stadium as part of a sponsorship deal with the online trades comparison company Checkatrade.

Stands

West Stand
 The West Stand is the main stand, running two-thirds of the length of the pitch. It contains club offices, merchandise shop, changing rooms and hospitality. It is raised above pitch level meaning that fans have to climb a small flight of stairs at the front to enter the seated area. Prior to the building of the East Stand, it was the only stand in the stadium to contain seats and a small section at the north end of the stand was available to away supporters. It is now entirely for home support.

North and South Stands
The North Stand and South Stand are two identical small roofed terraces. The South Stand contains the most vocal home support and the North Stand is allocated to away fans. Both stands curve around the corners of the pitch to meet up with the West Stand. The South Stand has been known as the Structured Communications Stand since December 2015.

East Stand
The East Stand is an all-seated roofed stand with a capacity of 2,154. It is mainly for home fans although some seats at the north end of the stand are available to away supporters. The stand opened for the first time on Good Friday 2012 for the League Two home game against Crewe Alexandra.

The stand was planned following promotion to the football league in May 2011, to comply with Football League regulations. Work on the East Stand of the stadium started in early February 2012. It replaced the uncovered East terrace which was a standing area. Between 2013 and 2015 it was known as the Checkatrade.com Stand but was renamed The People's Pension East Stand in December 2015 due to a sponsorship deal with B&CE.

Location
The stadium is located in Broadfield, Crawley. Next to a roundabout about a mile from Crawley railway station and two miles from Three Bridges railway station, which is on the Brighton Main Line. The roundabout has a large white and red football in the centre and is at the end of the Brighton Road, which is easy to find from junction eleven on the M23 motorway.

External links
Official website

References

Football venues in England
Women's Super League venues
Sports venues in West Sussex
Buildings and structures in Crawley
Multi-purpose stadiums in the United Kingdom
Crawley Town F.C.
Sports venues completed in 1997
English Football League venues
Sport in Crawley
1997 establishments in England